The Ronde van Gelderland was an elite women's road bicycle race held in the Netherlands between 2003 and 2016. It was rated by the UCI as a 1.2 category race, and was primarily centred around Apeldoorn. The race was originally only for men. In August 1957 the first Ronde van Gelderland was held, with the last men's race being held in 2003.

Past winners

References

External links 
 

 
Recurring sporting events established in 1957
1957 establishments in the Netherlands
Cycle races in the Netherlands
Women's road bicycle races
Cycling in Gelderland
Cycling in Apeldoorn